The State Security Committee of the Republic of Belarus (KGB RB; , КГБ РБ) is the national intelligence agency of Belarus. Along with its counterparts in Transnistria and South Ossetia, it kept the unreformed name after declaring independence.

It is the successor to the KGB of the Byelorussian SSR, a branch of the Soviet KGB which operated in the Byelorussian republic. Felix Dzerzhinsky, who founded the first Soviet secret police, the Cheka, was born in present-day Belarus and remains an important figure in the state ideology of Belarus under president Alexander Lukashenko as well as a patron of the Belarusian KGB. It is governed by the law About State Security Bodies of the Republic of Belarus.

The KGB has command over the Alpha Group as the main counter-terrorist unit, although they can be tasked to help the Militsiya and other law enforcement organizations in anti-crime operations.

History
On 1 March 1922, under the auspices Central Executive Committee of the BSSR, a State Political Directorate is formed. In July 1934, an NKVD republican affiliate was formed in the BSSR. 10 years later, during a reform of the Soviet Ministry of Internal Affairs, the Committee for State Security of the Byelorussian Soviet Socialist Republic (KGB of the BSSR) was formed, which would become an independent agency in 1978. On 25 August 1991, the Supreme Soviet of Belarus passed the Declaration of State Sovereignty of the Byelorussian Soviet Socialist Republic into constitutional law, effectively declaring independence from the USSR. In September 1991, the KGB of the BSSR was renamed to the KGB of the Republic of Belarus, becoming the new national security body of the state. 

In October of that year, the Supreme Soviet mandated by law that the State Security Committee is subordinate to the Supreme Council of Belarus. In order to ensure the security of the new republic, the government provided regulations to the agency in January 1992.

Major General Vadim Zaitsev, who was in charge of Lukashenko's personal security, was appointed its leader in July 2008. His tenure lasted until November 2012 and he was replaced by Valery Vakulchik. The KGB is formally controlled by the President of Belarus, Alexander Lukashenko. Human rights organizations, the United States, and the European Union have accused the KGB of secret police activities and human rights abuses.

Organization
The headquarters of the State Security Committee is located on Independence Avenue at the corner from Komsomolskaya Street. The building was built between 1945 and 1947 by architects Mikhail Parusnikov and Gennady Badanov. The building was erected in the style of Stalinist Architecture and Neoclassicism. The left wing stretches across Independence Avenue to adjoin the neighboring House of the Minsk Mutual Agricultural Insurance Association.

Structure
 Main Directorate of Counterintelligence Activities
 Main Directorate of Economic Security and Anti-Corruption
 Main Directorate for Provision of Operational Search Activities
 Government Communications Department
 Office of Military Counterintelligence (UVKR)
 Investigative Committee

Chairmen
Eduard Shirkovsky (30 October 1990 – 25 January 1994)
Gennady Lavitsky (22 February – 21 July 1994)
Vladimir Yegorov (28 July 1994 – 20 December 1995)
Vladimir Matskevich (20 December 1995 – 27 November 2000)
Leonid Erin (27 November 2000 – 18 November 2004)
Stepan Sukhorenko (20 January 2005 – 17 July 2007)
Yuri Zhadobin (17 July 2007 – 15 July 2008)
Vadim Zaitsev (15 July 2008 – 9 November 2012)
Leonid Maltsev (9–16 November 2012)
Valery Vakulchik (16 November 2012 – 3 September 2020)
Ivan Tertel (since 3 September 2020)

Role in political repressions
According to human rights organisations in the United States, and the European Union, the KGB and its senior leadership play a key role in human rights violations and political repressions in Belarus. The KGB has maintained both the name, the symbols and some of the repressive functions of its Soviet predecessor, the KGB of the Soviet Union.

Several dozens former Chairmen and senior officers of the KGB of Belarus have been included in the sanctions lists of the European Union and the United States, especially following the brutal crackdown of peaceful protests that followed the allegedly falsified presidential elections of 2006 and 2010. Against most of them, the sanctions have been lifted in 2016 following an improvement of Belarus–European Union relations.

On 2 October 2020, the European Union added former Chairman of the KGB Valery Vakulchik, as well as the Deputy Charimen, to its sanctions list. On 6 November, Chairman Ivan Tertel was sanctioned by the EU as well. These people are also subject to the restrictive measures by the United Kingdom, Switzerland, and Canada.

The KGB Alpha Group was placed under US Treasury Department sanctions for their role in suppressing the 2020-21 protests.

On 21 June 2021, the U.S. Treasury has added the KGB of Belarus and its Chairman Ivan Tertel to its Specially Designated Nationals and Blocked Persons List with the following motivation:

The State Security Committee of the Republic of Belarus (Belarusian KGB) has continually pressured and targeted the opposition in the aftermath of the fraudulent 2020 election.  The Belarusian KGB has detained, intimidated, and otherwise pressured the opposition, to include Pratasevich.  In November 2020, the Belarusian KGB added Pratasevich and another opposition journalist to its list of terrorists.

KGB officers sanctioned by the EU or the US

Chairmen and Deputy Chairmen
 Stepan Sukhorenko, Chairman of the KGB in 2005–2007, including during the 2006 Belarusian presidential election. On EU sanctions list in 2006–2016; remains under sanctions by the United States.
 Vadim Zaitsev, Chairman of the KGB. According to the decision of the European Union, he is “responsible for transforming the KGB into the main organ of repression of civil society and of the democratic opposition” and for state propaganda accusing the protesters of bringing weapons to their rally.” According to the EU, Zaitsev “personally threatened the lives and health of the wife and child of former presidential candidate, Andrei Sannikov. He is the main initiator of orders for unlawful harassment of  democratic opposition, the torture of political opponents and the  mistreatment of prisoners.”
 Vasily Dementei, First Deputy Chairman of the KGB; included in the EU sanctions list after crackdown of protests that followed the controversial presidential election of 2006.
 Igor Bakhmatov, former Deputy Chairman of the KGB in charge of the staff and the organisation of their tasks, responsible for the repressive work of the KGB against civil society and democratic opposition.
 Vasili Dementey, former First deputy Chairman of the KGB (2005–2007); responsible for repressions against civil society and the democratic opposition, in particular after the presidential election of 2006 and in 2007.
 Viktor Vegera, First Deputy Chairman of the KGB.
 Leonid Dedkov, Deputy Chairman of the KGB.
 Nikolai Smolenski, former Deputy Chairman of the KGB.
 Nikolai Svorob, former Deputy Chairman of the KGB.
 Petr Tretiak, former Deputy Chairman of the KGB and Member of the Commission of the Security Council on radio frequencies.
 Ivan Tertel, Deputy Chairman of the KGB, in charge of economic crime and the fight against corruption.

Torture
 Colonel Aleksandr Orlov, head of the KGB detention centre in Minsk: according to the EU, he was personally responsible for "cruel, inhuman and degrading treatment or punishment of detainees" in the weeks and months after the crackdown on the protests in Minsk on 19 December 2010, on the eve of the 2010 presidential election. He has been on EU sanctions list between 2011 and 2016.
 Colonel Oleg Chernyshev; he allegedly personally participated in tortures of opposition activists in the KGB detention centre in Minsk after the crackdown on the post-election protest demonstration in Minsk on 19 December 2010.
 Lieutenant Colonel Dmitri Sukhov, operative of the military counter-intelligence of the KGB; accused of falsifying evidence and using threats in order to extort confessions from detained opposition activists in the KGB detention centre in Minsk after the crackdown on the post-election protest demonstration in Minsk on 19 December 2010.
 Lieutenant Colonel Pavel Traulko, former operative of the  military counter-intelligence of the KGB, then head of the press service of the newly formed Investigative Committee of Belarus. He is accused of falsifying evidence and using threats in order to extort confessions from opposition activists in the KGB detention centre in Minsk after 19 December 2010. According to the EU, he was directly responsible for the use of “cruel, inhuman and degrading treatment or punishment and for denying the right to a fair trial”.

Sector (Board) commanders
 Viktor Yaruta, Head of the KGB Board on State Communications
 Valeri Maslakov, Head of the KGB Board of Intelligence
 Sergei Shugaev, Head of the KGB Counter-Intelligence Division  and former Deputy Head of the KGB Counter-Intelligence Board
 Ivan Sanko, Major, senior investigator of the KGB
 Aleksandr Tolstashov, Head of the KGB Board on Protection of the Constitutional Order and Fight Against Terrorism
 Igor Voropaev, former Head of the KGB Board on State Communications
 Sergei Volkov, former Head of the KGB Board of Intelligence
 Alexey Zakharov, former Head of Military Counter-intelligence Board of the KGB

Regional commanders
In 2011, commanders of the KGB in the regions of Belarus were accused by the EU of being responsible for political repressions in their regions:
 Igor Busko, Head of the KGB of the Brest Region
 Gennadi Gerasimenko, former Head of the KGB of the Vitebsk Region
 Vladimir Kalach, Head of the KGB of the Minsk Region and the city of Minsk, former Deputy Head of the KGB for Minsk
 Ivan Korzh, Head of the KGB of the Hrodna Region
 Igor Kuznetsov, former Head of the KGB in the Minsk Region and in Minsk city
 Ivan Leskovski, Head of the KGB for Homel and former Deputy Head of the KGB for Homel
 Igor Sergeenko, Head of the KGB of the City District of Mahiliou

International activity
On 1 December 2021, US-based Meta announced that 41 fake accounts on Facebook and 4 on Instagram belonging to Belarusian KGB were removed. The accounts criticised the actions of Poland during Belarus–European Union border crisis in English, Polish and Kurdish languages, while pretending to be journalists and activists.

On 10 April 2022, Meta reported that Internet accounts linked to KGB on the first day of Russian invasion of Ukraine tried to spread fake news about the surrender of Ukrainian army and flight of Ukrainian authorities.

See also
 Human rights in Belarus
 List of people and organizations sanctioned in relation to human rights violations in Belarus

References

External links

Official site of the State Security Agency of the Republic of Belarus 

Law enforcement agencies of Belarus
Domestic intelligence agencies
Secret police
Torture in Belarus
 KGB of Belarus
KGB
Belarusian entities subject to the U.S. Department of the Treasury sanctions
Specially Designated Nationals and Blocked Persons List